The 2004 National Club Baseball Association (NCBA) World Series was played at McKechnie Field in Bradenton, FL from May 26 to May 31. The fourth tournament's champion was Colorado State University. The co-MVP's were Andrew Abell and Thomas Ahrens, both of Colorado State University.

Format
The format is similar to the NCAA College World Series in that eight teams participate in two four-team double elimination brackets with the only difference being that in the NCBA, there is only one game that decides the national championship rather than a best-of-3 like the NCAA.  A major difference between the NCAA and NCBA World Series is that NCBA World Series games were only 7 innings (until 2006) while NCAA games are 9 innings.

Participants

Results

Bracket

Game Results

See also
2004 NCBA Regional Tournament

References

Baseball competitions in Florida
2004 in baseball
National Club Baseball Association
Sports in Bradenton, Florida